Urabe (written: , ,  or ) is a Japanese surname. Notable people with the surname include:

, Japanese ice hockey player
, Japanese biologist
, Japanese kickboxer
, Japanese musician
, Japanese footballer
, Japanese samurai
, Japanese pianist

Fictional characters
, a character in the manga series Mysterious Girlfriend X

Japanese-language surnames